The title Big Ten Championship Game may refer to several sporting events that are sponsored by the Big Ten Conference.
 Big Ten Football Championship Game determines the champion of the Big Ten football season
 Big Ten men's basketball tournament determines the winner of the conference's automatic bid to the NCAA Division I men's basketball tournament
 Big Ten women's basketball tournament determines the winner of the conference's automatic bid to the NCAA Division I women's basketball tournament